Melaleuca shiressii is a plant in the myrtle family, Myrtaceae and is endemic to a small area in New South Wales in Australia. (Some Australian state herbaria continue to use the name Callistemon shiressii.) It is rare shrub or small tree with pale, papery bark, sharp-pointed leaves and spikes of white to pale cream bottlebrush flowers in spring and summer.

Description
There is a mid-vein, marginal veins and 12–23 distinct lateral veins and there are many distinct oil glands. The edges of the leaves are often curled under and the lower surface is paler than the upper one.

The flowers are cream or greenish-cream and are arranged in spikes at the end of, or around the branches which continue to grow after flowering.

Taxonomy and naming
Melaleuca shiressii was first named in 2006 by Lyndley Craven in Novon when Callistemon shiressii was transferred to the present genus. Callistemon shiressii was first formally described in 1941 by William Blakely. The specific epithet (shiressii) honours David William Campbell Shiress who, with Blakely, collected the type specimen "on shale ridges about 1 mile north-west of Narara railway station".

Callistemon shiressii is regarded as a synonym of Melaleuca shiressii by the Royal Botanic Gardens, Kew.

Distribution and habitat
Melaleuca shiressii occurs in and between the Singleton and Richmond districts in New South Wales. It grows in moist forests and on ridges .

Gallery

References

shiressii
Flora of New South Wales
Plants described in 1941
Taxa named by Lyndley Craven